Dehuk (also Romanized as Dehūk and Dehook; also known as Dāhu, Dehak, and Dehū) is a village in Tasuj Rural District, Shonbeh and Tasuj District, Dashti County, Bushehr Province, Iran. At the 2006 census, its population was 168, in 42 families.

References 

Populated places in Dashti County